Borkenan-e Sofla (also Romanized as Borkenān-e Soflá; also known as Būrkenān-e Soflá) is a village in Bezenjan Rural District, in the Central District of Baft County, Kerman Province, Iran. At the 2006 census, its population was 135, in 33 families.

References 

Populated places in Baft County